Chinese ritual mastery traditions, also referred to as ritual teachings (sometimes rendered as "Faism"), or Folk Taoism, or also Red Taoism (mostly in east China and Taiwan), constitute a large group of Chinese orders of ritual officers who operate within the Chinese folk religion but outside the institutions of official Taoism. The "masters of rites", the fashi, are also known in east China as hongtou daoshi, meaning "redhead" or "redhat" daoshi ("masters of the Tao"), contrasting with the wutou daoshi, "blackhead" or "blackhat" priests, of Zhengyi Taoism who were historically ordained by the Celestial Master.

Zhengyi Taoism and Faism are often grouped together under the category of "daoshi and fashi ritual traditions". Although the two types of priests have the same roles in Chinese society—in that they can marry and they perform rituals for communities' temples or private homes—Zhengyi daoshi emphasize their Taoist tradition, distinguished from the vernacular tradition of the fashi.

Ritual masters can be practitioners of tongji possession, healing, exorcism and jiao rituals (although historically they were excluded from performing the jiao liturgy). The only ones that are shamans (wu) are the fashi of the Lushan school.

The fashi

The ritual masters ( fashi) are defined, in opposition to formally ordained Taoist priests, as:

Sarah Coakley (Cambridge University) distinguishes fashi as "kataphatic" (of filling character) in opposition to Taoists as "kenotic" (of emptying character), and links them to other Sino-Tibetan indigenous religions:

They are known by different names throughout China, other popular ones being "ritual officers" (faguan) as they at times call themselves, or "redhead" Taoist priests ( hongtou daoshi). There are also localised names, such as "orthodox lords" (duangong), "altar masters" (zhangtanshi), or "earth masters" (tulaoshi) in Guizhou.

They are also in competition with other orders who perform similar services: monks and tantric masters under the auspices of Buddhism, and tongji medium.

The difference between ritual masters and Deities' mediums is that instead of being subject to territorial gods like the mediums, the ritual masters can marshal the powers of local Deities.

Red Taoist orders

Lushan school
The Lushan (Mount Lu) school (also  or ), also known as Sannai school, is present in Fujian, southern Zhejiang and Taiwan. It is very active nowadays, and is related to the worship of the goddess Chen Jinggu ("Old Quiet Lady") the Waterside Dame ( Línshuǐ Fūrén), who is very popular in the same area. It is also related to the cult of Wang Laomu, and competing with Maoshan Taoism.

The tradition shows similarities with Yao and Zhuang ritual traditions, and has incorporated elements of Tantra, such as the use of mudra and vajra. Lushan fashi perform rituals as the head of celestial troops while invoking the "Three Ladies" (sannai): Chen Jinggu and her two disciples, Lin Jiuniang and Li Sanniang. Although Lushan fashi are men, in performance they wear the ritual red skirt of Chen Jinggu and a crown or headdress with the words "Three Ladies" painted on it. Lushan fashi also practice a shamanic voyage rite called "crossing the roads and the passes" (guo luguan).

Pu'an school
The Pu'an school is present in west-central Fujian, southern Jiangxi and Taiwan. The historical figure of the monk Pu’an is worshipped by the practitioners as their "founding master" (zushi). Their texts, rituals and iconography incorporate Tantric themes adapted in a Taoist style, and have elements of the Zhengyi and Lushan traditions.

Xujia school
The Xujia school is another form of ritual masters.

Northern orders
 Yuehu 
 Zhuli 
 Shenjia , families of hereditary specialists of gods and rites
 Yinyang masters or fengshui masters, using the Lingbao scriptural tradition

See also
 Confucianism
 Fuji (planchette writing)
 Nuo folk religion
 Dajiao
 Taoist schools
 Yao folk religion

Bibliography
 Taiwan Folk Religion Society. Faism and Folk Religion 2009,  2009. , Tai bei shi : Wen jin, 2011.09.  
 Yu-chi Tsao. On Ritual of Pu-An Fa-Jiao: The Case Study of Hexuan Taoist Altar in Tainan. Master's Thesis, Graduate Institute of Religious Studies, 2012.
 John Lagerwey. China: A Religious State. Hong Kong, University of Hong Kong Press, 2010. 
 John Lagerwey. Popular Ritual Specialists in West Central Fujian. Shehui, minzu yu wenhua zhanyan guoji yantao hui lunwen ji . Taipei: Hanxue yanjiu zhongxin. 435–507. 2001
 Edward L. Davis. Encyclopedia of Contemporary Chinese Culture. Routledge, 2005. 
 The Lady Linshui: How a Woman Became a Goddess. In: R. Weller and M. Shahar (eds). Unruly Gods. Divinity and Society in China. Honolulu: University of Hawai’i. 1996
 Lushan Puppet Theatre in Fujian. In: Daniel L. Overmyer (ed.). Ethnography in China Today: A Critical Assessment of Methods and Results. Taipei: Yuan-liou, 243–56. 2002
 Julian F. Pas, Man Kam Leung, Historical Dictionary of Taoism. (Lanham, MD: Scarecrow Press, 2014. ).
 
 Randall L. Nadeau. The Wiley-Blackwell Companion to Chinese Religions. John Wiley & Sons, 2012.
 Dick van der Meij. India and Beyond. Routledge, 1997. 
 Overmyer, Daniel. Local Religion in North China in the Early Twentieth Century: The Structure and Organization of Community Rituals and Beliefs. In: Handbook of Oriental Studies, Section 4: China, Vol. 22. Brill, 2009.

References

Chinese folk religion
Taoist schools
East Asian religions